Rebel Moon is an upcoming American epic space opera film directed by Zack Snyder from a screenplay he co-wrote with Shay Hatten and Kurt Johnstad, based on a story he also created with Johnstad. The film features an ensemble cast that includes Sofia Boutella, Charlie Hunnam, Ray Fisher, Djimon Hounsou, Jena Malone, Corey Stoll, Ed Skrein, Cleopatra Coleman, Fra Fee, Cary Elwes, and Anthony Hopkins.

Rebel Moon is scheduled to be released on December 22, 2023, by Netflix, with a limited theatrical release being planned. A follow-up, Rebel Moon Part 2, is scheduled to be shot with the film back-to-back.

Premise 
"A peaceful colony on the edge of the galaxy is threatened by the armies of a tyrannical regent named Balisarius. The desperate civilians dispatch Kora, a young woman who has a mysterious past to seek out warriors from nearby planets to help them challenge the regent."

Cast 
 Sofia Boutella as Kora, a young woman with a mysterious past sent to save the galaxy from Balisarius.
 Djimon Hounsou as General Titus, general of Balisarius' armies.
 Ed Skrein as Balisarius, a ruthless tyrannical regent who threatens the galaxy and the colony.
 Michiel Huisman
 Doona Bae
 Ray Fisher as Blood Axe
 Staz Nair
 Charlie Hunnam
 Anthony Hopkins as the voice of Jimmy, a sentient JC1435 mechanized battle robot and one-time defender of the slain King.
 Jena Malone
 Stuart Martin
 Corey Stoll 
 Cary Elwes
 Alfonso Herrera
 Cleopatra Coleman
 Fra Fee
 Rhian Rees

Production

Development 
Rebel Moon is inspired by the works of Akira Kurosawa and the Star Wars films. The film also began development as a Star Wars film that Snyder had pitched to Lucasfilm, in the time period between the conclusion of the prequel trilogy in 2005 and the sale of Lucasfilm to The Walt Disney Company in 2012. This pitch was to be a more mature take on the Star Wars universe. Following the acquisition, the project was redeveloped by producer Eric Newman and Snyder, first as an original television series, before settling on a film.

Casting
On November 2, 2021, it was announced that Sofia Boutella had been cast in the film. On February 9, 2022, Charlie Hunnam, Djimon Hounsou, Ray Fisher, Jena Malone, Staz Nair and Doona Bae joined the cast. Later that month, Stuart Martin and Rupert Friend joined the project. On April 8, 2022, Cary Elwes, Corey Stoll, Michiel Huisman and Alfonso Herrera joined the cast. On May 16, 2022, it was announced that Ed Skrein has replaced Friend as the film's main antagonist due to scheduling conflicts, with Cleopatra Coleman, Fra Fee and Rhian Rees joining the project. On June 8, 2022, it was announced that Anthony Hopkins had joined the cast as the voice of Jimmy, an impossibly sentient JC1435 mechanized battle robot and one-time defender of the slain King.

Filming 
Filming commenced as of April 19, 2022, with Snyder sharing the first images from the set on Twitter that day. It ran until December 2, with 152 days of filming taking place in California, to tap into $83 million in qualified spending and tax incentives.

Release 
The film is expected to be released on Netflix on December 22, 2023, as first revealed through a Netflix 2023 film preview posted to YouTube on January 18, 2023.

Future 
Speaking about the film's future as a franchise, Snyder said: "My hope is that this also becomes a massive IP and a universe that can be built out." In February 9, 2022 it was revealed that Rebel Moon would be a two part film, with both parts being shot back-to-back. In August 22, 2022, the follow-up was confirmed and revealed to be titled Rebel Moon Part 2.

References

External links 
 

2023 science fiction films
Upcoming Netflix original films
2020s English-language films
American science fantasy films
American science fiction action films
American science fiction adventure films
American space opera films
English-language Netflix original films
Films directed by Zack Snyder
Films produced by Zack Snyder
Films with screenplays by Kurt Johnstad
Films with screenplays by Shay Hatten
Films with screenplays by Zack Snyder
Films scored by Junkie XL
Films set on fictional planets
Films shot in California
The Stone Quarry films
Upcoming films